Milites were the trained regular footsoldiers of ancient Rome, and later a term used to describe "soldiers" in Medieval Europe.

Roman Era 
These men were the non-specialist regular soldiers that made up the bulk of a legion's numbers and were the social superiors of ordinary footsoldiers known as pedites. Alongside soldiering, they also performed guard duties, labour work, building and other non-combat roles, which increased their status in urban centers. Milites would usually have to serve for several years before becoming eligible for training to become immunes and thus become specialists with better pay.

Medieval Era 
The Latin term eventually became synonymous with "soldier", a general term that, in Western Europe, became associated with the mounted knight, because they composed the professional military corps during the Early Medieval Era. The same term, however, was expanded to mean less distinguished infantry soldiers (milites pedites). During the 13th century the term referred to the mounted horsemen who lacked knight-status, but still had similar properties and obligations to the dubbed knights.

Other usages include the "Milites Templi," referring to the Knights Templar, or Milites Sancti Jacobi (Order of Santiago).

From the Latin root, "" derived words such as "Military" and "Militia".

References

Military ranks of ancient Rome
Latin words and phrases